Thung Si Udom is a district (amphoe) in the southwestern part of Ubon Ratchathani province, northeastern Thailand.

Geography
Neighboring districts are (from the north clockwise) Det Udom, Nam Khun of Ubon Ratchathani Province and Kantharalak of Sisaket province.

History
The minor district (king amphoe) Thung Si Udom was created on 1 April 1992, when six tambons were split off from Det Udom district. The inclusion of tambon Thung Thoeng into the new district was undone on 1 June 1993. The minor district was upgraded to a full district on 10 October 1997.

Administration
The district is divided into five sub-districts (tambon), which are further subdivided into 52 villages (muban). There are no municipal (thesaban) areas, and five tambon administrative organizations (TAO).

Geocode 1 was assigned to Thung Thoeng, which was returned to Det Udom district

References

External links
amphoe.com

Thung Si Udom